Pipunculinae is a subfamily of big-headed flies (insects in the family Pipunculidae).

Genera
 Tribe Cephalopsini
 Genus Cephalops Fallén, 1810
 Genus Cephalosphaera Enderlein, 1936
 Tribe Microcephalopsini
 Genus Collinias Aczél, 1940
 Genus Microcephalops De Meyer, 1989
 Tribe Eudorylini
 Genus Allomethus Hardy, 1943
 Genus Amazunculus Rafael, 1986
 Genus Basileunculus Rafael, 1987
 Genus Claraeola Aczél, 1940
 Genus Clistoabdominalis Skevington, 2001
 Genus Dasydorylas Skevington, 2001
 Genus Elmohardyia Rafael, 1987
 Genus Eudorylas Aczél, 1940
 Tribe Tomosvaryellini
 Genus Dorylomorpha Aczél, 1939
 Genus Tomosvaryella Aczél, 1939
 Tribe Pipunculini
 Genus Pipunculus Latreille, 1802

References

Pipunculidae
Brachycera subfamilies